Sealed Verdict is a 1948 American adventure drama war film directed by Lewis Allen and starring Ray Milland and Florence Marly.

Plot
Maj. Robert Lawson (Ray Milland), a lawyer working in Germany as part of the American Army's tribunal for prosecuting Nazi war criminals, successfully convicts Gen. Otto Steigmann (John Hoyt) of war crimes. Defense witness Themis DeLisle (Florence Marly), whose French Resistance father's life was saved by Steigmann, insists the German officer is innocent. Despite pressure from his superiors, Lawson decides to reopen his investigation, uncovering evidence that may clear Steigmann.

Cast

 Ray Milland as Maj. Robert Lawson
 Florence Marly as Themis DeLisle
 Broderick Crawford as Captain Kinsella
 John Hoyt as Gen. Otto Steigmann
 John Ridgely as Capt. Lance Nissen
 Ludwig Donath as Jacob Meyersohn
 Norbert Schiller as Slava Rodal
 Dan Tobin as Lieutenant Parker
 Olive Blakeney as Camilla Cameron
 Marcel Journet as Captain Gribemont
 Paul Lees as Private Clay 
 James Bell as Mr. Elmer
 Elisabeth Risdon as Mrs. Cora Hockland
 Frank Conroy as Colonel Pike
 Celia Lovsky as Mrs. Emma Steigmann
 June Jeffery as Erika Wagner
 Patricia Miller as Maria Romanek
 Selmer Jackson as Dr. Bossin
 Charles Evans as General Kirkwood

External links 
 
 

1948 films
Films directed by Lewis Allen
Paramount Pictures films
1940s war drama films
American war drama films
Films set in Germany
Films scored by Hugo Friedhofer
American black-and-white films
1948 drama films
1940s American films